The LynxOS RTOS is a Unix-like real-time operating system from Lynx Software Technologies (formerly "LynuxWorks"). Sometimes known as the Lynx Operating System, LynxOS features full POSIX conformance and, more recently, Linux compatibility. LynxOS is mostly used in real-time embedded systems, in applications for avionics, aerospace, the military, industrial process control and telecommunications. As such, it is compatible with military-grade security protocol such as wolfSSL, a popular Transport Layer Security (TLS/SSL) library.

History 
The first versions of LynxOS were written in 1986 in Dallas, Texas, by Mitchell Bunnell and targeted at a custom-built Motorola 68010-based computer. The first platform LynxOS ran on was an Atari 1040ST with cross development done on an Integrated Solutions UNIX machine. In 1988-1989, LynxOS was ported to the Intel 80386 architecture. Around 1989, application binary interface (ABI) compatibility with UNIX System V.3 was added. Compatibility with other operating systems, including Linux, followed.

Full Memory Management Unit support has been included in the kernel since 1989, for the reliability of protected memory and the performance advantages of virtual addresses. The PowerPC architecture is also supported, and in February 2015 Lynx announced planned support for the ARM Cortex A-family.

LynxOS components are designed for absolute determinism (hard real-time performance), which means that they respond within a known period of time. Predictable response times are ensured even in the presence of heavy input/output (I/O) due to the kernel's unique threading model, which allows interrupt routines to be very short and fast.

Lynx holds an expired patent on the technology that LynxOS uses to maintain hard real-time performance.  was granted to Lynx November 21, 1995: "Operating System Architecture using Multiple Priority Light Weight kernel Task-based Interrupt Handling."

In 2003, Lynx introduced a specialized version of LynxOS named LynxOS-178, especially for use in avionics applications that require certification to industry standards such as DO-178B.

In late 2022, support for the programming language Rust was added to the certified toolchain for LynxOS-178 and LynxElement unikernel.

The Usenet newsgroup  is devoted to discussion of LynxOS.

References

External links 
 
 Patent #5,469,571: LynuxWorks' "Operating System Architecture using Multiple Priority Light Weight kernel Task-based Interrupt Handling."
 Whitepaper: Using the Microprocessor MMU for Software Protection in Real-Time Systems
 Applications using LynxOS and other Lynx operating systems

ARM operating systems
Embedded operating systems
Real-time operating systems
Unix variants